Liquidationism is the heterodox Austrian school belief in economics that no actions to mitigate the effects of recessions should be taken by the government or the central bank, but, rather, that the "temporary pain" of companies being liquidated, on account of crises, is a solution in itself. In contrast mainstream economists think that "we have every reason to think that governmental efforts to provide liquidity and fiscal stimulus, and to prevent the panic of contagion from collapsing the financial system, are warranted."

See also

Corporate welfare

References

Austrian School